Two Pianos Are Better Than One was released in 1994 by Telarc Records. The album contains works by Peter Schickele, sometimes under the pseudonym P. D. Q. Bach, including the "Concerto for Two Pianos vs. Orchestra, and three other works that don't require even one piano."

Performers
 Professor Peter Schickele, piano
 Jon Kimura Parker, piano
 The New York Pick-Up Ensemble, Jorge Mester, conductor
 Wayne Hedrick, flute
 Grace Lingen, flute
 Peter DuBeau, tuba
 Richard Fitz, tambourine
 Lowell Graham, finger snapper
 Susan Palma, flute/piccolo
 Stephen Taylor, oboe
 Lauren Goldstein, bassoon
 Early Anderson, trombone
 Gerald Tarack, violin
 Michael Willens, contrabass

Track listing
Introduction
Concerto for Two Pianos vs. Orchestra, S. 2 are better than one
Shake allegro
Andante alighieri
Presto changio
Introduction
Trio (sic) Sonata, S. 3(4) 
Antemezzo
Mezzo
Intermezzo
l'Altro Mezzo
Introduction
Chaconne à son Goût (Schickele)
Introduction
The Musical Sacrifice, S. 50% off
Fuga Meshuga
Sort of Little Trio Sonata
Andante
Allegro molto
Lento
Vivace
Three Canons
Chorale Prelude: "Da kommit ja der Schurke"
Four More Canons
The Grossest Fugue
Closing

Sources
 P.D.Q. Bach: Two Pianos Are Better Than One

P. D. Q. Bach albums
1994 albums
1990s comedy albums
Telarc Records albums